Akin "Ak" Reyes, better known as Ak (born November 10, 1979), is a TV sports broadcaster. He is employed by DAZN, a global live and on-demand sports streaming platform.

Reyes brings a unique, fresh and stylish approach to television whilst interviewing the biggest names in and around boxing, and entertainers, such as Anthony Joshua, Tyson Fury, Charlamagne Tha God, Tweet, 50 Cent, Canelo Álvarez, Deontay Wilder, Brandy Norwood, Sheryl Underwood, Akon, and Michael Buffer, to name a few.

Reyes is the lead host of The DAZN Boxing Show and Da Pull Up, aired on DAZN, with his co-host, Kamal Barak Bess.

Early life 

Reyes is of Puerto Rican and St. Lucian descent, born and raised in Brooklyn, New York. He currently resides in New Jersey.

Reyes and his brother, Shamir Reyes, were introduced to boxing by their father; Reyes went on to have over 70 amateur fights as Shamir embarked on a professional boxing career, signed under Don King Promotions, which enabled Reyes to learn about the boxing business.

Whilst in his 20s, Reyes worked as a fashion model, an actor, and for the family business.

Personal life 

Reyes is a father of one child. His son, Taj Marley Reyes, is featured in campaigns for Nike, Gap, Zara, Levis, Target, Footlocker, and he walked in the 2020 Nike New York Fashion Week, tribute to the late Kobe Bryant.

Career

2009
Reyes and his friend, Saleem 'Hitchcock' Thomas, hosted a radio show that was dedicated to Hip hop. However, Reyes, an avid fan of boxing, incorporated the sport into the show. The duo interviewed former undisputed welterweight boxing champion Zab Judah, which kickstarted Reyes' career in boxing journalism and broadcasting.

2015
Reyes and co-host, Barak, accepted the opportunity to host a show on SiriusXM called The Hype Men. The duo talked about boxing events, and included topics around pop culture.

2016
Reyes and his co-host were employed to host their own show,  The Sweet Scientists, on Thisis50.com, a website platform owned by rapper, actor, director and producer, Curtis '50 Cent' Jackson.

2018
DAZN "picked up" The Sweet Scientist, with Reyes and his co-host maintaining their position on the show.

2019
Reyes and his co-host brought a new and exciting show to DAZN called Da Pull Up. The duo pranks individuals who use social media platforms to 'troll' boxers. 'Ak and Barak' 'pull up' on the internet troll in a public setting, with the fighter they had disrespected online.

Reyes and Barak currently host their own show, The Ak and Barak Show, on SiriusXM and DAZN.

2020
The Ak and Barak Show is broadcast in more than 200 countries and territories, including the UK, following DAZN's delayed global launch on December 1st.

2021

Reyes was the co-host at two pay-per-view Boxing events, headlined by Ryan Garcia & Luke Campbell in January, and Saúl Canelo Àlvarez & Anvi Yildirim in February.

In April, Reyes announced the end of his contract with SiriusXM; however, his relationship with DAZN continues. DAZN created a new show, The DAZN Boxing Show, and secured 'Ak & Barak' as their lead hosts, bringing DAZN subscribers the latest news, opinions, star interviews, and all things Boxing, 5 days a week.

References 

1979 births
Living people